USS Selinur (AKA-41) was an  in srvice with the United States Navy from 1945 to 1946. She was scrapped in 1968.

History
Selinur (AKA-41) was named after the minor planet 500 Selinur, which in turn was named for a character in Friedrich Theodor Vischer's 1879 novel Auch Einer. The ship was laid down on 18 January 1945 under Maritime Commission contract (MC hull 1902) by the Walsh-Kaiser Co., Inc., Providence, R.I.; launched on 28 March 1945; sponsored by Mrs. Wilton Carter; and commissioned on 21 April 1945.

After shakedown, Selinur departed Norfolk, Va., on 27 May 1945 with cargo and personnel for Hawaii, arriving at Honolulu on 18 June. After making cargo voyages to Midway, Hilo, Majuro, and Kwajalein, Selinur sailed from Pearl Harbor on 1 September with occupation troops for Japan and arrived at Sasebo on 22 September. She next sailed for Manila, whence she returned to Sasebo and reported for "Magic Carpet" duty on 20 October. The cargo vessel made two voyages bringing troops home, one from Sasebo and Okinawa and the other from Tacloban, P.I., before being released from "Magic Carpet" duty at San Francisco on 24 January 1946. She arrived at Philadelphia on 16 April for inactivation.

Decommissioning and fate 
Selinur was decommissioned on 30 April, transferred to the Maritime Commission and simultaneously loaned to the Pennsylvania Nautical School as Keystone State. She was struck from the Navy list on 8 May 1946. The ship was returned to the Maritime Commission in 1947 and laid up in the James River as a unit of the National Defense Reserve Fleet. She was sold by the Maritime Administration on 15 July 1968 to the Northern Metals Co., Philadelphia, for scrapping.

References

External links

 NavSource Online: AKA-41 Selinur
 51 Years of AKAs

 

Artemis-class attack cargo ships
World War II amphibious warfare vessels of the United States
Ships built in Providence, Rhode Island
1945 ships